Walter Raymond Osterkorn (July 6, 1928 – January 11, 2012) was an American professional basketball player.

A 6'5" forward from the University of Illinois, Osterkorn began his pro career with the St. Paul Lights of the National Professional Basketball League during the 1950-51 season. When St. Paul folded 20 games into the season, he was obtained by the Sheboygan Red Skins, who at that time were in their 13th season of operation, the longest-running professional basketball franchise in the nation. Osterkorn played the final 19 games for Sheboygan and helped the Red Skins to a league-best 29-16 record. He was named to the NPBL's second team as a forward after averaging 13 points per game, sixth-best in the league.

Osterkorn then played four seasons (1951–1955) in the National Basketball Association as a member of the Syracuse Nationals.  He averaged 7.0 points per game and won a league championship in 1955. He died in 2012.

References

External links

1928 births
2012 deaths
American men's basketball players
Centers (basketball)
Chicago Stags draft picks
Illinois Fighting Illini men's basketball players
Power forwards (basketball)
Sheboygan Red Skins players
Syracuse Nationals players
Washington Generals players
Basketball players from Chicago